Buchneria is a genus of millipedes belonging to the family Julidae.

The species of this genus are found in Italy.

Species:

Buchneria cornuta 
Buchneria sicula

References

Julida
Millipede genera